Chambersburg is an unincorporated community in Paoli Township, Orange County, in the U.S. state of Indiana.

History
Chambersburg was laid out in 1840 by Samuel Chambers, who named it for himself. The community was a station on the Underground Railroad.

A post office was established at Chambersburg in 1849, and remained in operation until it was discontinued in 1912.

Geography

References

Unincorporated communities in Indiana
Unincorporated communities in Orange County, Indiana